Karori was a New Zealand electorate, situated in the west of Wellington. It existed from 1946 to 1978, and was represented by three different Members of Parliament during that period, all of them are represented by National Party due to being a wealthy suburb.

Population centres
The 1941 New Zealand census had been postponed due to World War II, so the 1946 electoral redistribution had to take ten years of population growth and movements into account. The North Island gained a further two electorates from the South Island due to faster population growth. The abolition of the country quota through the Electoral Amendment Act, 1945 reduced the number and increased the size of rural electorates. None of the existing electorates remained unchanged, 27 electorates were abolished, eight former electorates were re-established, and 19 electorates were created for the first time, including Karori.

The electorate of Karori was created for the 1946 elections. Its initial boundaries were roughly the same as the abolished Wellington West electorate, except that it did not include Brooklyn or Ngaio. It included Karori proper, Northland, Wilton, Mākara, and parts of Kelburn.

Redistributions for the 1954 elections saw it lose a small amount of territory to Wellington Central electorate, and gain a small amount from Onslow electorate. Redistributions for the 1957 elections saw it again gain territory (parts of Khandallah and Ngaio) from Onslow, but lose territory to Wellington South electorate. For the Redistributions for the 1963 elections, it gained the whole of Khandallah and Johnsonville from the abolished Onslow electorate, but lost Kelburn, Northland, and Wilton. The 1969 elections saw it lose Johnsonville, regain parts of Wilton and Northland, and gain Ohariu. In the 1972 elections, it lost ground in Wilton and Northland, but regained parts of Johnsonville.

The new electorate of Ohariu was roughly based on the Karori electorate, but did not include any of Khandallah or Ngaio.

History
The electorate was held by the National Party for the duration of its existence. Its longest occupant, Jack Marshall, briefly served as Prime Minister.

Members of Parliament
The Karori electorate was represented by three Members of Parliament.

Key

Election results

1975 election

1972 election

1969 election

1966 election

1963 election

1960 election

1957 election

1954 election

1951 election

1949 election

1946 election

Notes

References

Historical electorates of New Zealand
Politics of the Wellington Region
1946 establishments in New Zealand
1978 disestablishments in New Zealand